Martina Mariea McBride (née Schiff, born July 29, 1966) is an American country music singer-songwriter and record producer. She is known for her soprano singing range and her country pop material.

McBride was born in Sharon, Kansas, and relocated to Nashville, Tennessee in 1989. She signed to RCA Records in 1991, and made her debut the following year as a neo-traditionalist country singer with the single, "The Time Has Come". Over time, she developed a pop-styled crossover sound, similar to Shania Twain and Faith Hill, and had a string of major hit singles on the Billboard country chart and occasionally on the adult contemporary chart. Five of these singles went to No. 1 on the country chart between 1995 and 2001, and one peaked at No. 1 on the adult contemporary chart in 2003.

McBride has fourteen studio albums, two greatest hits compilations, one "live" album, as well as two additional compilation albums. Eight of her studio albums and two of her compilations have an RIAA Gold certification, or higher. In the U.S., she has sold over 14 million albums. In addition, McBride has won the Country Music Association Award for Female Vocalist of the Year award four times (tied with Reba McEntire for the third-most wins) and the Academy of Country Music's "Top Female Vocalist" award three times. She is also a 14-time Grammy Award nominee.

Early life
McBride was born in Sharon, Kansas, on July 29, 1966. She has two brothers, Martin and Steve, who play in her concert band as of 2017, and a sister, Gina.

McBride's parents, Daryl and Jeanne Schiff, owned a dairy farm. Daryl, who was also a cabinetry shop owner, exposed her to country music at a young age. Listening to country music helped her acquire a love for singing. After school, she sang for hours along to the records of such popular artists as Reba McEntire, Linda Ronstadt, Juice Newton, Jeanne Pruett, Connie Smith, and Patsy Cline. Around the age of eight or nine, Martina began singing with a band her father fronted, "The Schiffters." As she grew older her role in the band progressively increased, from simply singing, to also playing keyboard with them. She enjoyed performing in her early years.

McBride began performing with a local rock band, The Penetrators, in Wichita instead. Then, in 1987, Schiff gathered a group of musicians called Lotus and started looking for rehearsal space; she began renting space from studio engineer John McBride. In 1988, the two married.

After marrying, the couple moved to Nashville, Tennessee, in 1989 with the hope of beginning a career in country music. John McBride joined Garth Brooks's sound crew and later became his concert production manager. She occasionally joined her husband on the road and helped sell Garth Brooks souvenirs. In 1990, impressed by her enthusiastic spirit, Brooks offered her the position of his opening act provided she could obtain a recording contract. During this time, while her husband was working with country artists Charlie Daniels and Ricky Van Shelton, he also helped produce her demo tape, which helped her gain a recording contract with RCA Nashville Records in 1991.

Music career

1992–1995: The Time Has Come and The Way That I Am
McBride released her debut studio album by RCA Records in 1992, titled The Time Has Come. It was produced by Paul Worley and Ed Seay. This album's title track made it to number 23 on the country music charts, while the next two singles both failed to make the Top 40. Unlike her later country pop-influenced albums, The Time Has Come featured honky tonk and country folk influences.

The Way That I Am was McBride's second album. Its first two singles both brought her into the country top ten: "My Baby Loves Me," the album's de facto title song, peaked at number two, and "Life No. 9" peaked at number six. The former was previously a Top 10 hit in Canada for Patricia Conroy. The third single, "Independence Day", was prevented from reaching the Top 10 through the oppositions of many radio programmers, who objected to the song's subject of a mother fighting back against abuse by burning the family home to the ground. "Independence Day" won Video of the Year and Song of the Year at the Country Music Association Awards. It also earned the song's composer, Gretchen Peters, a nomination for the Grammy Award for Best Country Song. The song also gave McBride a nomination for the Grammy Award for Best Female Country Vocal Performance. McBride performed the song at the 1995 Grammys ceremony. The fourth and fifth singles from The Way That I Am were less successful: "Heart Trouble" peaked at number 21, and "Where I Used to Have a Heart" fell short of the Top 40. McBride later criticized these single choices, saying that she felt "Strangers" would have been a better followup, as that song was more popular with fans and later appeared on her first greatest-hits album. The Way That I Am was certified platinum by the Recording Industry Association of America (RIAA).

"My Baby Loves Me (Just The Way That I Am)," as produced and released, proved to have a sing-along quality that led McBride to sing it that way in her subsequent concerts.

1995–1999: Wild Angels and Evolution
McBride's third album, Wild Angels, was released in 1995. It accounted for another Top 5 hit in its lead single "Safe in the Arms of Love", which had previously been recorded by both Wild Choir and Baillie & the Boys, and was concurrently released in Canada by Michelle Wright at the time of McBride's version. The album's title track went on to become McBride's first No. 1 single on the country charts in early 1996. The album's third, fourth, and fifth singles,  "Phones Are Ringin' All Over Town", "Swingin' Doors", and "Cry on the Shoulder of the Road" were less successful, having reached the lower regions of the Top 40.

In early 1997, after "Cry on the Shoulder of the Road" peaked, McBride released two duets. "Still Holding On", a duet with Clint Black which was the lead-off single to her fourth album Evolution and Black's album Nothin' but the Taillights, and "Valentine", a collaboration with pop pianist Jim Brickman which appeared on his album Picture This. She also sang duet vocals on "Chances Are" with Bob Seger, featured on the soundtrack of the 1998 motion picture Hope Floats.

She had her second number one on the country charts with "A Broken Wing", the second single from her Evolution album, in late 1997. Evolution went on to produce four more Top 10 hits at country radio: a re-release of "Valentine", "Happy Girl", "Wrong Again" (which also went to number one), and "Whatever You Say". Towards the end of 1998, the album was certified double platinum in sales by the Recording Industry Association of America for selling two million units. In addition, she also won the Country Music Association Awards' "Female Vocalist of the Year" award in 1999 and also performed for President Bill Clinton during the same time.

Also in 1998, McBride released her first Christmas album titled White Christmas, which featured a rendition of "O Holy Night" that first charted in 1997 and continued to re-enter the charts until 2001. She also sang a guest vocal on Jason Sellers' mid-1998 single "This Small Divide".

1999–2002: Emotion and Greatest Hits

McBride's sixth studio album, Emotion, was released in 1999. Its lead single, "I Love You," reached number one on the Billboard country charts in 1999, and also crossed over to the Adult Contemporary chart. The song's follow-ups, "Love's the Only House" and "There You Are", both made the Top 5 at country radio, and "It's My Time" peaked at number 11.

In 2001, she released her first compilation, Greatest Hits. This album has been certified 3× Platinum in sales by the Recording Industry Association of America, and is her highest-selling album. It included most of her major hits to that point, and the album track "Strangers" from the album The Way That I Am, which she put on the album because she felt that it should have been a single. The album also included four new songs, all of which were Top 10 hit on the country music charts between 2001 and 2003: "When God-Fearin' Women Get the Blues" (at number 8), "Blessed" (at number 1), "Where Would You Be" (at number 3), and "Concrete Angel" (at number 5). Carolyn Dawn Johnson sang backing vocals on "Blessed"; conversely, McBride sang backing vocals on Johnson's late-2000 debut single, titled "Georgia". Late in 2002, McBride also sang backing vocals on Andy Griggs's single "Practice Life".

2003–04: Martina
In 2003, McBride released her seventh studio album, Martina, which celebrated womanhood. The first single, "This One's for the Girls," went to number 3 on the country charts and became her only number-one hit on the Adult Contemporary charts. It also included backing vocals from Faith Hill, Carolyn Dawn Johnson, and McBride's daughters, Delaney and Emma. Follow-up single "In My Daughter's Eyes" was also a Top 5 hit at both country and adult contemporary. "How Far" and "God's Will" both made the Top 20 at country radio, as did her guest appearance on Jimmy Buffett's single "Trip Around the Sun", whose chart run overlapped that of "God's Will".

In 2004, McBride won the CMA's Female Vocalist award for the fourth time, following the wins in 2003, 2002 and 1999, which tied her for the most wins in that category with Reba McEntire.

2005–2008: Timeless and Waking Up Laughing

After finding success in country pop-styled music, McBride released her next studio album, Timeless, in 2005, which consisted of country covers. The album included cover versions of country music standards, such as Hank Williams' "You Win Again," Loretta Lynn's "You Ain't Woman Enough," and Kris Kristofferson's "Help Me Make It Through the Night." To make the album fit its older style, McBride and her husband hired older Nashville session players and outdated analog equipment. The album sold over 250,000 copies within its first week, the highest sales start for a McBride album. The lead single, a cover of Lynn Anderson's "(I Never Promised You a) Rose Garden", went to number 18 on the country charts, but the other two singles both failed to make top 40.

In 2006, McBride served as a guest coach on Canadian Idol. The remaining five finalists traveled to Nashville, where McBride worked with the competitors on the songs they had chosen by country artists such as Gordon Lightfoot and Patsy Cline. Among the other guest judges that year were Nelly Furtado and Cyndi Lauper.
McBride later joined Canadian Idol on a tour in the Spring.
In 2007, McBride also served as a guest coach on Fox Networks television series, American Idol.

In 2007, McBride released her ninth studio album, Waking Up Laughing. It was the first album in which McBride co-wrote some of the tracks. She set up her Waking Up Laughing Tour in 2007, which included country artists Rodney Atkins, Little Big Town, and Jason Michael Carroll. The album's lead single, "Anyway", went to No. 5 on the Billboard Country Chart, becoming her first Top 10 hit since 2003. She also lent her voice singing "Anyway" in a Lifetime movie called, "A Life Interrupted" which premiered on April 23, 2007. Its follow-up, "How I Feel", reached the Top 15. In Spring 2008, McBride released Martina McBride: Live In Concert, a CD/DVD set. It was taped in Moline, Illinois in September 2007.

In July 2007, The ABC Television Network announced a special program called Six Degrees of Martina McBride where individuals from around the country were challenged to find their way to McBride on their own connections and research using a maximum of six methods. The "winner" of this challenge eventually located a direct connection to McBride through her husband, John, who knew someone, who knew someone else.
McBride recorded an electronically produced duet with Elvis Presley, performing his song "Blue Christmas" as a duet with him on his latest compilation, The Elvis Presley Christmas Duets. A compilation collection, titled Playlist: The Very Best of Martina McBride, was released on December 16, 2008, as part of Sony BMG Playlist series. The album features 11 previously released tracks and three unreleased tracks.

2008–2010: Shine
McBride wrapped up production of her tenth studio album in late 2008. The first single, "Ride", was released to radio in October 2008 and debuted at No. No. 43 on the Hot Country Songs chart. It barely missed the Top 10 on the chart, peaking at number eleven in March 2009. A music video produced by Kristin Barlowe was also released at the end of the year. The album, Shine, was released by RCA Records on March 24, 2009, and debuted at the top of the U.S. Country album chart and number 10 on the Billboard 200. McBride co-produced the album with Dann Huff, and it featured "Sunny Side Up", a song that she co-wrote. The second single, "I Just Call You Mine", was released in May 2009 and reached the Top 20. The third single from Shine was "Wrong Baby Wrong Baby Wrong", which the Warren Brothers co-wrote with Robert Ellis Orrall and Love and Theft member Stephen Barker Liles.

McBride also initiated the Shine All Night Tour, a co-headlining venture with fellow country star and friend Trace Adkins and opening act Sarah Buxton. The tour began in November 2009 and ended in May 2010.

On June 10, 2010, Billboard announced that McBride had collaborated on a song with Kid Rock. In late June 2010, McBride was nominated for a Teen Choice Award, "Favorite Country Female Artist", alongside country stars Carrie Underwood, Miranda Lambert, Taylor Swift and Gretchen Wilson.

In late 2010, McBride was nominated for two American Country Awards (Best Female Single & Touring Artist of the year w/ Trace Adkins.) Along with the ACA nominations, she received her 14th Female Vocalist nomination for Country Music Association in October.

2010–2016: Eleven and Everlasting

McBride exited RCA in November 2010 and signed with Republic Nashville. She began working on a new studio album with producer Byron Gallimore. Her first single for Republic Nashville is "Teenage Daughters", which she also co-wrote with the Warren Brothers. McBride told Country Weekly that she co-wrote eight of the eleven songs on the album; she decided to write more frequently because she felt more confident in her songwriting ability after "Anyway" had become a hit. An album track, "One Night" was released as a promotion for NASCAR with a music video in June 2011.

"I'm Gonna Love You Through It" was released as the album's second single on July 25, 2011. The song became a critical and commercial hit, peaking at number 4 and becoming her first top five hit since 2006's "Anyway." The album, titled Eleven, was released on October 11, 2011. Its third single was a cover of Train's "Marry Me", recorded as a duet with Train lead singer Pat Monahan. In September 2011, McBride was nominated for the CMA's Female Vocalist award for the 15th time, and 14th time consecutively.

RCA Records released two compilation albums in 2012, Hits and More in January and The Essential Martina McBride in October.

McBride released Everlasting, a collection of R&B and Soul covers, on April 8, 2014, via Kobalt Label Services. The album includes duets with Kelly Clarkson and Gavin DeGraw, and was produced by Don Was.

In September 2014, McBride received her 17th Female Vocalist nomination from the Country Music Association. She was tied with Reba McEntire for most nominations in any vocalist category, until McEntire's 18th nomination in 2017.

2016–present: Reckless and Vocal Point podcast
In 2016, McBride released a new single called "Reckless", the title track for a new album. Reckless was released on April 29 through Nash Icon Records. It was recorded at Blackbird Studios and produced by Nathan Chapman and Dann Huff. The album includes 10 songs, one of which is the previously released single "Reckless". According to McBride, making this album felt like "coming home". Reckless debuted at number 2 on the Billboard Top Country Albums Chart.

On June 8, 2016, McBride debuted the video for her second single, "Just Around The Corner", during the CMT Music Awards. This song is the official Band Against Cancer anthem. Band Against Cancer is a community-based movement led by Sarah Cannon (the cancer institute of HCA) in partnership with Big Machine Label Group and McBride, which aims to raise awareness, support and resources to those diagnosed with cancer. The initiative includes a series of concerts across United States, with McBride as a headliner.

In August 2016, the singer announced a new tour called "Love Unleashed". According to McBride, the purpose of the tour was to unite people and spread love through the power of music as a response to the "tragedy and uncertainty in the world". She was also selected as one of 30 artists to perform on "Forever Country", a mash-up track of Take Me Home, Country Roads; On the Road Again; and I Will Always Love You which celebrates 50 years of the CMA Awards.

In July 2017, McBride revealed she is planning on releasing a Christmas album, of which she said " It won't have as many hymns on it. It will be more things like 'Santa Claus Is Comin' To Town' and 'It's Beginning To Look A Lot Like Christmas.'" She has now said it will be out in 2018, "One is a new Christmas album, which will come out in 2018." The Christmas album It's the Holiday Season was released on October 19, 2018. This will accompany a Christmas tour, called "Joy of Christmas" as well as a cookbook called "Martina's Kitchen Mix: My Recipe Playlist for Real Life" which will be out October 30, 2018. This would be McBride's second cookbook, following her 2014 release called "Around the Table: Recipes and Inspiration for Gatherings Throughout the Year". Martina has launched a new show on Food Network, airing on Sundays at 11am eastern.

In 2019, McBride began the podcast Vocal Point, a "free-wheeling, wide-ranging" topical conversation series.

On May 4, 2020, McBride appeared in the second-season episode of NBC's Songland and released the song "Girls Like Me".

In March 2022, McBride sold her Master Royalty Rights to Primary Wave. The company also took ownership and distribution rights for her Everlasting album and the singer's It's the Holiday Season Christmas album. McBride was announced as the opening act for The Judds Final Tour, scheduled to begin in summer 2022 however, Naomi Judd died before the tour could begin. Her daughter, Wynonna, announced at her memorial that she and McBride would honor the tour dates as a tribute to Naomi.

Personal life
In 1988, Martina Schiff, as she was known up to that time, married sound engineer John McBride, taking his family name as her stage name. The couple has three daughters: Delaney Katharine (born December 22, 1994), Emma Justine (born March 29, 1998) and Ava Rose Kathleen (born June 20, 2005). After becoming a mother, the singer reduced her touring schedule so that her daughters could have a normal upbringing. Joe Galante said this was "an enormous choice in terms of money," but McBride had made it very clear that she wanted to be present in her daughters' lives.

Charity work

McBride works with a variety of charities. She has served as a spokeswoman for the National Domestic Violence Hotline as well as for the National Network to End Domestic Violence and national spokeswoman for the Tulsa Domestic Violence and Intervention Services. Every year since 1995, she has hosted Middle Tennessee's YWCA, "Celebrity Auction", and it has raised nearly $400,000 so far. McBride was awarded the "Minnie Pearl Humanitarian Award" in 2003. In 2004, she worked with "Kids Wish Network" to fulfill the wish of a young girl dying from muscular dystrophy.

McBride explained that educating girls and women on domestic violence is something she works on at home with her own daughters, stating:

McBride has also teamed up with Loveisrespect, National Teen Dating Abuse Helpline, working with them on a new program called, "My Time to Shine."

McBride appeared on the Stand Up 2 Cancer Telethon in September 2010, where she performed "Unchained Melody" with Leona Lewis, Aaron Neville, and Stevie Wonder. Also in 2010, she hosted the YWCA for the 16th consecutive year, raising over $50,000. It totals over $500,000 dollars raised so far.

McBride also has a charity initiative called "Team Music is Love". Speaking about Team Music Is Love, McBride stated "It started a few years ago as a group of fans that asked me if they could wear a T-shirt with my name to walk in a breast cancer walk, and I said 'of course' and it has grown from there. Last year, we decided we wanted to give it a better name, a name that sounded as important as it is, so we changed it to 'Team Music is Love,' since it's about spreading love through music. We have done some amazing things over the past few years and we continue to grow and keep giving back."

Discography

1992: The Time Has Come
1993: The Way That I Am
1995: Wild Angels
1997: Evolution
1998: White Christmas
1999: Emotion
2003: Martina
2005: Timeless
2007: Waking Up Laughing
2009: Shine
2011: Eleven
2014: Everlasting
2016: Reckless
2018: It's the Holiday Season

Tours
Headlining
Evolution Tour 
Emotions Tour 
Greatest Hits Tour 
Timeless Tour 
Waking Up Laughing Tour 
One Night Tour 
Everlasting Tour 
Love Unleashed Tour 

Co-headlining
Virginia Slims on the Legends 
Lilith Fair 
Girls Night Out 
Alan Jackson and Martina McBride in Concert 
Shine All Night Tour 

Holiday concert
Joy of Christmas Tour 

Opening act
World Tour '93-'94 
Walkin on Sundown Tour 
Easy Come Easy Go Tour 
Everywhere Tour 
The Cowboy Rides Away Tour 
The Final Tour

Awards and nominations
McBride has received a number of awards, including the Country Music Association Award (CMA) for Female Vocalist of the Year, with her fourth win in 2004. In 2011 she received and honorary CMA award. She has been nominated for 14 Grammy Awards, but has never won.

Grammy Awards

Note: In 1995, McBride was one of the various artists featured on the album Amazing Grace – A Country Salute to Gospel (singing "How Great Thou Art"), which won the Grammy Award for Best Southern, Country or Bluegrass Gospel Album. This award went to the compilation album's producer Bill Hearn, and not to the artists.

Other awards

References

External links

1966 births
Living people
American country singer-songwriters
American women country singers
American sopranos
Country musicians from Kansas
Country musicians from Tennessee
Country pop musicians
Grand Ole Opry members
Members of the Country Music Association
Musicians from Nashville, Tennessee
People from Barber County, Kansas
RCA Records Nashville artists
Republic Records artists
Singer-songwriters from Tennessee
20th-century American singers
20th-century American women singers
21st-century American singers
21st-century American women singers
Singer-songwriters from Kansas